Rockland is a census-designated place (CDP) and the primary community in Rockland Township, Ontonagon County, Michigan, United States. It is along US Highway 45, which leads north  to its terminus at Ontonagon on Lake Superior, and south  to Eagle River, Wisconsin. 

Rockland was first listed as a CDP prior to the 2020 census.

Demographics

References 

Census-designated places in Ontonagon County, Michigan
Census-designated places in Michigan
Unincorporated communities in Ontonagon County, Michigan
Unincorporated communities in Michigan